Miss World 2004, the 54th edition of the Miss World pageant, was held on 4 December 2004 at the Crown of Beauty Theatre in Sanya, China. The 2004 pageant marks the second straight year that Sanya played host of the pageant. Rosanna Davison of Ireland crowned her successor María Julia Mantilla of Peru. 107 contestants from all over the world competed for the crown marking at that time, the biggest turnout in the pageant's 54-year history. That record was held until Miss World 2008 where 109 nations sent representatives.

Results

Placements

Continental Queens of Beauty

Order of Announcements

Top 15

Top 5

Contestants
107 contestants participated in Miss World 2004.

Notes

Debut

Returns

Last competed in 1988:
 
Last competed in 1993:
 
Last competed in 1994:
 
Last competed in 1997:
 
Last competed in 2000:
 
 
Last competed in 2002:

Withdrawals
  – Silvia Hackl - She withdrew at the last minute for personal reasons.
 - Tracy Lynn D. De Rosario - Due to financial problems and lack of Sponsorship.
  - María Jimena Rivas Fernández - Due to visa problems.

No Shows
  - Karmen Hamdaoui
  - Lusine Tovmasyan
  – Nelly Dembo Osongo - Due to lack of Sponsorship and visa problems. However she competed a year later at Miss World 2005.
  - Damaris Stephanie García Guerrero
  - Florence Zeka
 - Sodtuya Chaadrabal 

Never confirmed

Replacements
  - Miss Aruba 2003, Fatima Salie was unable to compete in Miss Universe & Miss World 2004 due problems with her nationality. She was replaced by her first runner up, Luisana Nikualy Cicilia. 
  - Mari-Liis Sallo
  - Claudia Hein 
  - The winner of Femina Miss India World 2004, Lakshmi Pandit gave up the crown to 2nd Runner-Up - Sayali Bhagat
  - Connie Ross

Country Changes
 Holland changed its name to Netherlands.

Crossovers 
Contestants who previously competed or will be competing at international beauty pageants:

Miss Universe
2002: :  Sarah Davies
2004: : Stacy-Ann Rose Kelly
2004: :  Heba Ahmad El-Sisy
2004: :  Anita Uwagbale
2004: : Joan Ramagoshi
2005: : Agnesa Vuthaj
2005: : Shermain Jeremy 
2005: : Luisana Nikulay Cicilia 
2005: : Nadine Njeim
2005: : Marie-Natasha Antoo
2005: : Adéle Basson
2005: : Fiona Hefti (Top 10)
2006: : Kenisha Thom (Top 10)

Miss International
2003: : Amber Peebles
2005: : Brianna Clarke
2005: : Queenie Chu
2005: : Amy Guy

Miss Earth
2005: : Cristina Reyes (Top 16)
2005: : Tania Domaniczky (Top 8)
2005: : Katarzyna Borowicz (2nd Runner-up)

Miss Europe
2005: : Helen Gustafson
2006: : Katarzyna Borowicz (3rd Runner-up)

World Miss University
2003: : Lisa Huang Shu Jun

Miss Tourism Queen International
2008: : Cassandra Castro (6th place and Continental Queen of the Americas)

Miss Asia Pacific Quest
2002: : Aishwarya Sukhdeo

Miss Chinese International
2002: : Lisa Huang Shu Jun

Reina Sudamericana
2004: : María Apuri
2004: : Tania Domaniczky (Winner)

Miss Continente Americano
2006: : Melissa Piedrahita (Top 6)

Reinado Internacional del Café
2004: : Melissa Piedrahita (3rd Runner-up)

Miss Europe/Miss Europa (Unofficial)
2002: : Antonella Vella

References

External links

Miss World
2004 in China
2004 beauty pageants
Beauty pageants in China
December 2004 events in China